The 135th Massachusetts General Court, consisting of the Massachusetts Senate and the Massachusetts House of Representatives, met in 1914 during the governorship of David I. Walsh. Calvin Coolidge served as president of the Senate and Grafton D. Cushing served as speaker of the House.

Committees
 Joint committees: Agriculture; Banks and Banking; Cities; Constitutional Amendments; Counties; Education; Election Laws; Federal Relations; Fisheries and Game; Harbors and Public Lands; Insurance; Labor; Legal Affairs; Mercantile Affairs; Metropolitan Affairs; Military Affairs; Municipal Finance; Public Health; Public Institutions; Public Lighting; Public Service; Railroads; Roads and Bridges; Social Welfare; State House and Libraries; Street Railways; Taxation; Towns; Water Supply.
 Senate committees: Bills in the Third Reading; Engrossed Bills; Judiciary; Rules; Ways and Means.
 House committees: Bills in the Third Reading; Elections; Engrossed Bills; Judiciary; Pay-Roll; Rules; Ways and Means.

Senators

Representatives

See also
 1914 Massachusetts gubernatorial election
 63rd United States Congress
 List of Massachusetts General Courts

References

Further reading

External links
 
 

Political history of Massachusetts
Massachusetts legislative sessions
massachusetts
1914 in Massachusetts